Christer Lipovac (born 7 March 1996) is a Swedish footballer, of Croatian descent, who plays for Karlslunds IF as a forward.

Career
Lipovac signed his first professional deal at age 16 when his boyhood club Karlslunds IF gave him a first team contract in 2012. The following year he was bought by Örebro SK who loaned him back to Karlslund for the 2013 season so that he could get playtime at the fourth tier level. On 4 May 2014 he made his Allsvenskan debut when he came on as a second-half substitute in an away game against Kalmar FF.

International career
In September 2013 Lipovac was selected to the Sweden national under-17 football team that would compete in the 2013 FIFA U-17 World Cup.

Honours
Sweden U17
 FIFA U-17 World Cup Third place: 2013

References

External links

1996 births
Living people
Swedish people of Croatian descent
Association football forwards
Örebro SK players
Allsvenskan players
Swedish footballers
Sweden youth international footballers